Nova Olinda is a municipality located in the Brazilian state of Tocantins.

References

Populated places established in 1980
Municipalities in Tocantins
1980 establishments in Brazil